Nima Ghavidel (also spelled Nima Qavidel, born May 12, 1984 in Iran) is an Iranian footballer.

Club career
He moved to Persepolis F.C. in 2006 from his previous club Niroye Zamini F.C.

References

Iranian footballers
Association football midfielders
Persepolis F.C. players
Naft Tehran F.C. players
Saipa F.C. players
Nassaji Mazandaran players
1984 births
Living people
Niroye Zamini players
People from Rasht
Sportspeople from Gilan province